Vesteris Seamount, also known as Vesteris Bank, is a seamount in the Greenland Sea of the North Atlantic Ocean between Greenland and Norway. It lies north of Jan Mayen and rises from 41–43 million years old ocean crust. The reasons for the volcanic activity at Vesteris are unclear and may involve lithospheric processes.

It is a volcano formed chiefly by basanitic rocks and has an erosion-flattened top. The seamount is covered by lava flows and subsidiary cones. The seamount started developing no earlier than 13 million years ago and eruptions continued until the Pleistocene/Holocene transition; there were a number of eruptions in the last 60,000 years. Whether there was Holocene activity 5,000–6,000 years ago or present-day hydrothermal activity is unclear.

A variety of lifeforms are found both on Vesteris Seamount and within its rocks. Layers of sponges and bryozoans cover the upper parts of the seamount and form structures like mounds. This ecosystem has been compared to coral reefs.

History 

Vesteris Seamount was probably known to fishers and seal hunters for over a hundred years as there is a large amount of fish above Vesteris Seamount, which draws both seals and fishers alike to the seamount. The seamount was originally named Vesterisbanken by Eggvin 1963, which showed Vesteris on his bathymetric map.

Geography and geology 

The summit area of the seamount is flat, probably due to wave erosion during the Weichselian glaciation, and sediment cover is scarce. Lava flows extend from the summit area to depths of almost , and sheet flows, scarps, pillow lavas, lava tubes and lava debris have been observed on the seamount. Carbonate sediments cover its top.

The seamount is elongated in about northeast-south-southwest direction, with ridges radiating from its northern sector and the lower southern sector spreading southwestward like a tongue. This elongation matches the trend of magnetic lineations on the surrounding seafloor, implying that it may be controlled by the surrounding tectonic environment. About 15–20 parasitic vents dot the deeper flanks of the seamount and reach  height, and small ridges en echelon to Vesteris are found on the southeastern flank.

A channel created presumably by turbidites from Greenland passes northward west of Vesteris. There is no evidence of additional volcanic edifices in the neighbourhood of the seamount, or of any other similar seamounts in the wider region, although recent volcanic intrusions may occur in the direct neighbourhood of the seamount.

Composition 

Volcanic rocks dredged from Vesteris include basanite as the major component, phonotephrite and tephrite but also alkali basalt, mugearite and trachybasalt. Samples taken are porphyritic, rich in vesicles and contain phenocrysts of amphibole, clinopyroxene, kaersutite, olivine and plagioclase; these minerals also make up the groundmass of the rocks.

These volcanic rocks define two separate geochemical suites, one formed by the basanites-tephrites and the other by the alkali basalts-mugearites. The formation of these two magma suites has been explained with fractional crystallization processes, mixing between different magmas and partial melting. Geochemical patterns indicate that the source magmas of Vesteris have similar sources as the magmas involved in other volcanoes of the North Atlantic north of Iceland. Differences between volcanic rocks erupted earlier in the history of the volcano and more recent products may imply that magma chemistry changed over time.

Aside from primary volcanic rocks, drop stones carried to the seamount by icebergs have been found on Vesteris as well.

Origin of the volcanism 

Vesteris Seamount is an intraplate volcano. Several different theories have been proposed to explain its origin:
 One theory presumes that mantle melts could rise through the lithosphere in cracks generated by the tectonics of the Mid-Atlantic Ridge and that this process is responsible for the formation of Vesteris Seamount. The elongated shape of the seamount and the parallelism with other bathymetric features in the region supports the idea that the seamount formed on a zone of crustal weakness.
 The seamount was at first proposed to have originated over a Jan Mayen hotspot. An origin at a mantle plume has been considered to be unlikely, even if the recent volcanism were to be considered rejuvenated, and there is no evidence of a hotspot track.
 It may have formed at the Mid-Atlantic Ridge, but based on its shallow depth and the young radiometric ages it appears to be a younger feature. Sedimentation patterns around the seamount also do not support a formation in a near-ridge environment.

Eruption history 

Vesteris Seamount was active for no longer time than the last 13-7 million years; volcanic activity at the seamount occurred in episodic stages. Rock samples from the summit area have yielded ages of about 110,000 years ago, while argon-argon dating has shown that trachybasalts and trachytes were erupted 650,000–500,000 years ago and the mugearites between 85,000–10,000 years ago.

Ash layers and traces of past hydrothermal activity suggest that Vesteris was active during the Quaternary, with frequent eruptions in the last 60,000 years. Some ash layers have been estimated to be less than 25,000 years old on the basis of the sedimentation rates albeit with great uncertainty, others were emplaced between 16,000–14,000 years ago and there is evidence of even younger ash layers including one emplaced around 11,900 years ago. Some ash layers may have been emplaced by pyroclastic flows or turbidity currents. During the last ice age when the summit of Vesteris Seamount was close to the sea surface, phreatomagmatic eruptions generated ash falls.

One ash layer has been found and appears to imply an eruption between 6,000–5,000 years ago although it is not certain that Holocene eruptions occurred; the most recent eruption may have occurred at the Pleistocene/Holocene boundary. If there was Holocene activity that would make Vesteris the only known Holocene seamount in the Arctic. There is no evidence for present-day or historic activity at Vesteris, although low temperature hydrothermal activity may be occurring.

Biology and climate 

Vesteris Seamount displays high biological productivity. The summit area of the seamount is densely inhabited by mats and biogenic structures formed by ascidians, bryozoans, polychaetes and sponges; in other sectors of the volcano sponges are accompanied by crinoids. Bryozoans and sponges make up most of the biogenic constructions, with Palmiskenea skenei the principal bryozoan. Actinians, brittle stars, crustaceans, hydrozoans, molluscs, radiolarians, sea urchins, serpulids and starfish are also found, as well as foraminiferal sands. Similar lifeforms are also found on the lower slopes of the seamount. Traces of endolithic fungi have been found in rock samples from the seamount and worm tubes are found in the softer ground.

Life on Vesteris has formed a variety of structures, including hedges, mats, mounds, spurs and thickets, and a dense layer of biogenic sediments and living specimens covers large areas of the upper Vesteris Seamount. The fauna has been subdivided into three distinct zones according to their depth. This environment has been compared to a coral reef.

The seamount lies close to the polar front with the East Greenland Current transporting freshwater from ice melt and ice to the seamount. Sediment cores from Vesteris Seamount have been used to reconstruct climatic and oceanic conditions of the North Atlantic after the last glacial maximum.

See also 

 Shimada Seamount

References

Sources

External links 
 
 
 

Pleistocene volcanoes
Holocene volcanoes
Seamounts of the Atlantic Ocean
Undersea banks of the Atlantic Ocean